Pork Pie  (also known as Joyride in certain countries) is a 2017 New Zealand road comedy film written and directed by New Zealander Matt Murphy and produced by Tom Hern. The film is a remake of the 1981 movie Goodbye Pork Pie, the first New Zealand film to win a substantial local audience. The remake stars Dean O'Gorman, James Rolleston and Ashleigh Cummings as a trio of accidental outlaws who travel the length of New Zealand in a stolen orange New Mini. The film was scored by Jonathan Crayford.

Cast
 Dean O'Gorman as Jon
 James Rolleston as Luke Anahera
 Ashleigh Cummings as Keira Leigh-Jones
 Antonia Prebble as Suzie Davidson, Jon's girlfriend
 Matt Whelan as Noah
 Siobhan Marshall as Becca
 Ben Mitchell as Motorcycle Cop
 Thomas Sainsbury as Bongo
 Geraldine Brophy as Andy
 Rima Te Wiata as Mrs Davidson

with cameo appearances from Karl Burnett, Tim Shadbolt, Eric Young, Paul Henry and Simon Dallow

Production

The original Goodbye Pork Pie is a low budget feature film directed by Matt Murphy's father Geoff, and written by Geoff Murphy and Ian Mune. In 2014, a remake was announced, to be directed by Matt Murphy, who was part of the crew on the original 1981 version. The same year, Matt Murphy directed a reenactment of the Lake Hawea chase from the first film, as an advertisement for the New Mini.

Filming of Pork Pie (A.k.a. Joyride) started in March 2016. Dean O'Gorman, James Rolleston and Ashleigh Cummings were set to star as Jon (John), Luke (Gerry) and Keira (Shirl) respectively. The film's first trailer was released on 17 October 2016.

Reception

Box office
Pork Pie was released in New Zealand on Thursday, February 2, 2017, and Australia on Wednesday, April 5, 2017, where opening weekend earnings totaled US$204,839 and US$8,715 respectively. The film ultimately grossed US$788,924 in the home market and US$58,383 in Australia, for total box office of US$797,639 worldwide.

Critical response

New Zealand critics
Local reviews were mixed. Steve Newall of Flicks.co.nz awarded the film 3 stars out of 5, writing "Pork Pie is probably not as bad as you think it's going to be," and adding "It’s just so depressingly familiar though, driven by predictable plotting, well-worn tropes and unenthusing character arcs. And while Pork Pie whacks in a few “fucks” and tokes of weed, it's devoid of the freewheeling anarchic sensibility it is theoretically channeling." Graeme Tuckett of Stuff.co.nz writes the film is "an update that lacks the original's spice." And the New Zealand Herald's review awards the film 2.5 stars out of 5, and states "Any hope that the remake of Goodbye Pork Pie could recapture the ol' yellow magic of the original evaporates fairly early on," while concluding with "Higher performance car, lower performance remake." Sarah Watt, also from stuff.co.nz, describes the film as “a joyous adventure”, and Dana Tetenburg from Tearaway Magazine describes the film as “an eccentric adventure with its nature based in the journey rather than the destination. I laughed for the majority of the first half, and cried through the majority of the second, which in my books is a sign of a great film”.

Overseas critics
International reviews of the film to date have been positive. On Rotten Tomatoes the film has an approval rating of 100% based on reviews from 10 critics.

Eddie Cockrell from Variety describes it as a “sleek, kinetic and eye-catching retooling of the 1981 film”, with a story “cleverly updated by writer-director Matt Murphy”, and “crucially, the casual misogyny of the 1981 release has been replaced by an unforced social conscience”.

Sydney Morning Herald's Paul Byrnes described the film as “more fun than a barrel of monkeys”; and Alison Lesley from Access Reel writes, "The film is so enjoyable in its absurdity that it’s near impossible to fault”. She reviewed the film 9/10 and writes “this is a film that refused to be pinned down by a single genre, and is simultaneously moving, hilarious, and gripping as it ups the stakes constantly, to an epic and explosive end”.

The film was well received at the 2017 Cannes Film Festival and is expected to be distributed internationally.

References

External links
 

2017 films
2017 comedy films
2010s road movies
2010s chase films
New Zealand comedy films
Films set in New Zealand
Films shot in New Zealand
2010s English-language films
2010s New Zealand films